IFAF Oceania is the governing body of American football in Oceania. It is a member of the International Federation of American Football. IFAF Oceania replaced the Oceania Federation of American Football (OFAF) in 2012.

Members

Competitions 
Australia and New Zealand compete in the annual Oceania Bowl.

References

External links
 IFAF Oceania on the IFAF Website

International Federation of American Football
Amer
American football governing bodies
2012 establishments in Oceania
Sports organizations established in 2012